The Taoyuan City Stadium is a multi-use stadium in Taoyuan District, Taoyuan City, Taiwan.  It is currently used mostly for football matches and it also has an athletics track. The stadium has a capacity of 30,000 people.

History
The stadium was originally built in 1993 as Taoyuan County Stadium. In 2014, it was changed to Taoyuan City Stadium.

Transportation
The stadium is accessible within walking distance east of Taoyuan Station of Taiwan Railways Administration.

See also
 List of stadiums in Taiwan

References

External links

 Stadium images

1993 establishments in Taiwan
Athletics (track and field) venues in Taiwan
Buildings and structures in Taoyuan City
Multi-purpose stadiums in Taiwan
Football venues in Taiwan
Sports venues completed in 1993